The Tamchinsky datsan (Tamchyn Dasan), also called the Tamchinskii datsan or Gusinoozyorsk Datsan, is a Buddhist monastery founded in the mid-18th century in the village of Gusinoye Ozero, located on the south-western shore of Lake Gusinoye, Buryat Republic, Russia.

In 1809, the monastery became "the center of Buddhism in eastern Siberia". 

Lama Dashi-Dorzho Itigilov received his medical training here.

The temple, which was ransacked in the 1930s, was being restored as of 2013 "as part of the revival of the Buddhist cultural and spiritual legacy in Buriatiia."

Ceremonies at the temple were filmed in the Pudovkin's fictional drama Storm Over Asia (1928 film).

References 

Buddhism in Buryatia
Buddhist monasteries in Russia
Gelug monasteries
Cultural heritage monuments of federal significance in Buryatia